Punar Vivaah (International Title: Married Again) is an Indian Hindi-language soap opera that aired on Zee TV from 20 February 2012 replacing Bhagonwali-Baante Apni Taqdeer till 17 May 2013. The show was set in the city of Bhopal and revolved around lead characters Yash and Aarti.

The first season concluded on 17 May 2013 and a second season titled Punar Vivah - Ek Nayi Umeed with new lead characters and a new storyline, replaced it from 20 May 2013.

Plot 
Punar Vivaah is the story of two individuals, Yash and Aarti. Based in Bhopal, Yash Scindia is a wealthy widower living with his two daughters Payal and Palak. Aarti is a divorcée and lives with her son Ansh. Yash is a wedding planner.

Aarti's in-laws and Yash's family want the two lonely hearts to get united in marriage. Aarti's in-laws decide to let Yash's family believe Aarti has been widowed like Yash. Yash and Aarti get married for the well-being of their children and Aarti soon makes place for herself in Yash's joint family. Yash, however, continues to live with memories of his first wife Arpita. On a trip to Mumbai, Yash and Aarti come closer and Aarti confesses to him that she has fallen in love with him. Soon, Yash cuts short the vacation and they return home where Yash declares he has no relationship with Aarti and refuses to speak to her. After several days, Aarti is still clueless till she faints and is informed she is pregnant. She recalls that after consuming bhaang at a temple, they consummated their marriage and Yash feels guilty for betraying his former wife and blames Aarti. Aarti finally confronts Yash and refuses to accept that the act of consummation was one-sided. She starts living with him again for the sake of their families but maintains a distance from him and hides her pregnancy from everyone.

Complications arise in Aarti's pregnancy but she chooses to leave with her son Ansh and boards a bus. Meanwhile, Yash's aunt discovers Aarti's pregnancy and the entire family finds out but only after Aarti has left. She meets with an accident and she and Ansh reach the hospital with help from her first husband Prashant. Yash sets out looking for her and Prashant discovers that Aarti is married to Yash. Yash and Aarti finally reunite at a mazaar and Yash and Aarti return home with Ansh as Prashant looks on. Meanwhile, Yash's younger brother Prateek and his wife Paridhi continuously argue about Paridhi's work hours as she goes off on shoots and her disregard for the family. Paridhi gets drunk for a shoot and sleeps with her producer who starts blackmailing her. In an altercation, Paridhi inadvertently hits him and he dies. Paridhi confides in her mother who tells her to stay quiet about all the events.

An ailing Prashant returns to his parents but is diagnosed with advanced stage cancer and requires a bone marrow transplant from his biological son Ansh. Prashant's mother Shobha is forced to ask for Aarti's help and they manage to get Ansh's bone marrow for Prashant's treatment whilst keeping it a secret from Yash and his family. Prashant is cured and refuses to leave home even as Aarti finally tells Yash about him and how while she was pregnant with Ansh, Prashant selfishly left her for another woman. Yash falls in love with Aarti but believes she would want to return to her first love Prashant but Aarti sets out to prove that she loves only Yash even as Prashant decides to get her back. Prashant's aunt exposes Aarti's past before the Scindias who are shocked and unforgiving at first till Yash defends her. Aarti and Yash are banished to another part of the house and Yash's father instructs the family to sever ties with them and their children.

Prashant decides to plot against Yash and Aarti to separate them. However, eventually, Yash and Aarti reunite with the family and Yash brings Akash to the family. This creates tensions and Gayatri starts hating Yash who is revealed to be Suraj Pratap's son with his other wife Radha and was swapped at birth with Akash who is actually Gayatri's biological son. Akash and his wife Ishita have designs on the Scindia wealth and influence Gayatri who disowns Yash. Suraj Pratap instead, names Yash as the sole heir to his wealth. A fight breaks out between Akash and Yash and Gayatri is grievously injured. At the hospital, she finally realises her mistake and apologises to Yash and Suraj Pratap as she dies in Yash's arms.

A month later, Akash and Ishita manage to turn the family against Radha with only Yash and Aarti supporting her. They make Suraj Pratap and the family realise her value and Suraj Pratap decides to marry her to give her her rightful place. After he gets into trouble with his thug friends, Akash has a change of heart when Aarti rescues him and saves his life.

New complications arise after Aarti and Yash's son Aayu is born but someone kidnaps him soon after. The culprit is revealed to be Ishita. Ishita becomes obsessed with Yash creating problems between him and Aarti. They don't talk to each other for months after losing Aayu. Aayu returns to the family as an orphan who is adopted by Prateek and Paridhi. Aarti feels a strange connection with the baby and finds comfort in him. Aarti soon discovers the truth about Ishita and together with Yash, she gets Aayu back; however, seeing Paridhi's sad face, Aarti and Yash decide to give Aayu to Prateek and Paridhi. Ishita comes back and kidnaps Aayu again. However, Yash saves Aayu and gets Ishita arrested as the show ends. The Scindia family introducing the new characters for Season 2.

Cast

Main
 Kratika Sengar as Aarti Scindia – Prashant's former wife; Yash's wife;  Mother of Ansh ,Aayu,Palak,and Payal.
 Gurmeet Choudhary as Yash Scindia – Suraj Pratap and Radha's son; Pankaj, Akash and Prateek's half-brother; Arpita's widower; Aarti's husband; Father of  Payal, Palak, Aayu, and Ansh.

Recurring
 Shweta Munshi as Arpita Scindia – Yash's first wife; Payal and Palak's mother
 Vineet Raina / Sarwar Ahuja as Prashant Dubey – Shobha and Satyendra's son; Aarti's ex-husband; Ansh's father
 Geeta Tyagi as Shobha Dubey – Prashant's mother
 Amit Singh Thakur as Satyendra Dubey – Prashant's father
 Chetan Pandit as Suraj Pratap Scindia – Radha and Gayatri's husband; Yash, Pankaj, Akash and Prateek's father
 Zahida Parveen as Gayatri Scindia – Suraj Pratap's first wife; Pankaj, Akash and Prateek's mother.
 Dolly Minhas as Radha Scindia – Suraj Pratap's second wife, Yash's mother; Akash's foster mother
 Pallavi Rao / Ananya Khare as Maaya - Suraj Pratap's sister
 Rakesh Kukreti as Pankaj Scindia – Suraj Pratap and Gayatri's eldest son; Akash and Prateek's brother; Yash's half-brother; Vidhi's husband; Vedika's father
 Samragyi Nema as Vidhi Scindia – Pankaj's wife; Vedika's mother
 Dishank Arora as Prateek Scindia – Suraj Pratap and Gayatri's youngest son
 Leena Jumani as Paridhi Scindia – Prateek's wife
 Akshay Dogra as Akash Scindia – Suraj Pratap and Gayatri's second son; Radha's foster son; Pankaj and Prateek's brother; Yash's half-brother; Ishita's husband
 Heena Parmar as Ishita Scindia – Akash's wife
 Divyam Dama as Ansh Scindia – Aarti and Prashant's son; Yash's foster son; Aayu's half-brother
 Palak Dey as Palak Scindia – Yash and Arpita's daughter; Aarti's foster daughter; Aayu's half-sister
 Dhriti Mehta as Payal Scindia – Yash and Arpita's daughter; Aarti's foster daughter; Aayu's half-sister
 Amita Udgata as Tai – Prashant's aunt
Asha Negi as Purvi Deshmukh Kirloskar

Adaptations

Dubbed versions

References

External links 
 Punar Vivaah on YouTube

Zee TV original programming
2012 Indian television series debuts
2012 Indian television series endings
Shashi Sumeet Productions series